The seventh edition of the Women's Asian Amateur Boxing Championships were held from August 07 to August 13, 2015 in Wulanchabu, China.

Medalists

Medal table

References
amateur-boxing

Asian Amateur Boxing Championships